"I'll Fly Away" is the last single by the group Banaroo from their album Fly Away. It is also the final single to feature the original four members of Banaroo.

Formats and track listings
These are the formats and track listings of major single releases of "I'll Fly Away".
Maxi CD
"I'll Fly Away"  – 3:21
"Uh Mamma (Extendet Version)" - 4:57
"Uh Mamma (Karaoke Version)" - 43:19
"Summer In The Sun" - 3:33

Charts

References

Banaroo songs
2007 singles
Songs written by Alexander Geringas
Songs written by Ivo Moring
2007 songs
Universal Records singles